In mathematics, a web permits an intrinsic characterization in terms of Riemannian geometry of the additive separation of variables in the Hamilton–Jacobi equation.

Formal definition
An orthogonal web on a Riemannian manifold (M,g) is a set  of n pairwise transversal and orthogonal foliations of connected submanifolds of codimension 1 and where n denotes the dimension of M.

Note that two submanifolds of codimension 1 are orthogonal if their normal vectors are orthogonal and in a nondefinite metric orthogonality does not imply transversality.

Alternative definition
Given a smooth manifold of dimension n, an orthogonal web (also called orthogonal grid or Ricci’s grid) on a Riemannian manifold (M,g) is a set  of n pairwise transversal and orthogonal foliations of connected submanifolds of dimension 1.

Remark
Since vector fields can be visualized as stream-lines of a stationary flow or as Faraday’s lines of force, a non-vanishing vector field in space generates a space-filling system of lines through each point, known to mathematicians as a congruence (i.e., a local foliation). Ricci’s vision filled Riemann’s n-dimensional manifold with n congruences orthogonal to each other, i.e., a local orthogonal grid.

Differential geometry of webs
A systematic study of webs was started by Blaschke in the 1930s. He extended the same group-theoretic approach to web geometry.

Classical definition
Let  be a differentiable manifold of dimension N=nr. A d-web W(d,n,r) of codimension r in an open set  is a set of d foliations of codimension r which are in general position.

In the notation W(d,n,r) the number d is the number of foliations forming a web, r is the web codimension, and n is the ratio of the dimension nr of the manifold M and the web codimension. Of course, one may define a d-web of codimension r without having r as a divisor of the dimension of the ambient manifold.

See also
 Foliation
 Parallelization (mathematics)

Notes

References

Differential geometry
Manifolds